Saint Louis du Sud is a coastal commune in the Aquin Arrondissement, in the Sud department of Haiti. Home to Fort des Oliviers, Fort Anglais and Bonnet Carré, the town is also the modern day location of  the 1748 Battle of Saint-Louis-du-Sud. Saint Louis du Sud is home to over 59,042 inhabitants.

Settlements
On August 14, 2021 an M7.2 earthquake struck 12 kilometres (7.5 mi) northeast of the commune. It is the largest earthquake in Haiti since the M7.0 in 2010 that killed 316,000 people

References

External links
 

Populated places in Sud (department)
Communes of Haiti